The Thomas Frazer House, at 590 N. 300 West in Beaver, Utah, was built in 1870 and modified in 1872 and around 1890.  It was listed on the National Register of Historic Places in 1978.

It was a work of Scotland-born sculptor and stonemason Thomas Frazer.

At listing date, it was home of NRHP nominator Linda L. Bonar and her husband.

References

		
National Register of Historic Places in Beaver County, Utah
Houses completed in 1870